Hongzhuang (Chinese: 红庄) is a station on Line 4 of Suzhou Rail Transit. The station is located in Wuzhong District of Suzhou. It has been in use since April 15, 2017, the same time of the operation of Line 4.

Hongzhuang station serves as an intersection point between the two branches of Line 4, going towards Muli and Tongli.

Station structure
A cross-platform interchange is provided between the main line and the branch of Line 4.

References 

Suzhou Rail Transit stations
Railway stations in China opened in 2017